7th Rifle Division can refer to:

 7th Guards Rifle Division
 7th Rifle Division (Soviet Union)
 7th Siberian Rifle Division